The Prime Minister of the United Arab Emirates is the head of government of the Federal government of the United Arab Emirates. While not required by the UAE constitution, the practice is that the ruler of Dubai serve as the prime minister and vice president of the UAE.

The first prime minister, Maktoum bin Rashid Al Maktoum, took office on 9 December 1971. He left office on 25 April 1979 and was succeeded by his father Rashid bin Saeed Al Maktoum, the vice president of the United Arab Emirates. Every prime minister since has also held the title of vice president. Upon the death of Sheikh Rashid Al Maktoum on 7 October 1990, his son Sheikh Maktoum Al Maktoum became prime minister for a second time. Upon Sheikh Maktoum Al Maktoum's death on 11 February 2006 while on a visit to the Gold Coast of Australia, his younger brother Mohammed bin Rashid Al Maktoum, the current prime minister, succeeded him.

The UAE's prime minister chairs the  Council of Ministers, which meets once a week in the capital, Abu Dhabi.

List of officeholders (1971–present)

See also
 President of the United Arab Emirates

References

United Arab Emirates, Prime Ministers
Prime Ministers
Prime Ministers
 
United Arab Emirates
Prime Minister
1971 establishments in the United Arab Emirates
Prime ministers